The John Gabriel Fort House is a historic house in rural Logan County, Arkansas.  It is located at a bend in Reveille Valley Road, roughly midway between Paris and Magazine.  It is a single-story structure, consisting of two log pens joined by a side gable roof, with a frame addition extending to the rear.  The logs have been hand-hewn square, and are joined by dovetail notches.  Built about 1848, it is one of the county's oldest buildings, and is its best example of a "saddlebag" style house.

The house was listed on the National Register of Historic Places in 1996.

See also
National Register of Historic Places listings in Logan County, Arkansas

References

Houses on the National Register of Historic Places in Arkansas
National Register of Historic Places in Logan County, Arkansas
Houses completed in 1848
Houses in Logan County, Arkansas